Anthony Ulonnam is a Nigerian Paralympic powerlifter. He represented Nigeria at the 2012 Summer Paralympics held in London, United Kingdom and he won the silver medal in the men's 56 kg event.

He represented Nigeria at the 2010 Commonwealth Games and he won the silver medal in the men's Open bench press event.

At the 2014 World Championships he won the bronze medal in the men's 59 kg event.

At the 2015 African Games he won the silver medal in the men's 59 kg event.

References

External links 
 

Living people
Year of birth missing (living people)
Place of birth missing (living people)
Commonwealth Games medallists in weightlifting
Commonwealth Games silver medallists for Nigeria
Weightlifters at the 2010 Commonwealth Games
Powerlifters at the 2012 Summer Paralympics
Competitors at the 2015 African Games
African Games competitors for Nigeria
Medalists at the 2012 Summer Paralympics
Paralympic silver medalists for Nigeria
Paralympic medalists in powerlifting
Paralympic powerlifters of Nigeria
Nigerian powerlifters
21st-century Nigerian people
Medallists at the 2010 Commonwealth Games